Aaron Paul (born Aaron Paul Sturtevant; August 27, 1979) is an American actor, best known for portraying Jesse Pinkman in the AMC series Breaking Bad (2008–2013), for which he won several awards, including the Critics' Choice Television Award for Best Supporting Actor in a Drama Series (2014), Satellite Award for Best Supporting Actor – Series, Miniseries, or Television Film (2013), and Primetime Emmy Award for Outstanding Supporting Actor in a Drama Series. This made him one of only two actors to win the latter category three times (2010, 2012, 2014) since its separation into comedy and drama. He has also won the Saturn Award for Best Supporting Actor on Television three times (2009, 2011, 2013), more than any other actor in that category. He reprised the role of Jesse Pinkman six years after the end of the series in the 2019 Netflix film El Camino: A Breaking Bad Movie and again during the final season of the spin-off series Better Call Saul in 2022, earning further critical acclaim.

Paul began his career with roles in several music videos, guest roles in television, and minor roles in films. In 2007, he had a recurring role as Scott Quittman on the HBO series Big Love (2006–2011), and in 2009 he starred in the remake of The Last House on the Left. Following Breaking Bad, he starred in films such as Need for Speed (2014), Hellion (2014), Exodus: Gods and Kings (2014), Eye in the Sky (2015), and Central Intelligence (2016). He also voiced Todd Chavez in the Netflix animated series BoJack Horseman (2014–2020), on which he was also an executive producer, and portrayed Eddie Lane in the Hulu drama series The Path (2016–2018) and Caleb Nichols in the HBO science fiction drama series Westworld (2020–2022).

Early life
Aaron Paul Sturtevant was born in Emmett, Idaho, on August 27, 1979, the youngest of four children born to Darla (née Haynes) and Baptist minister Robert Sturtevant. He was born a month premature in his parents' bathroom. He grew up participating in church plays. He graduated in 1997 from Centennial High School in Boise, Idaho, after which he drove to Los Angeles in his 1982 Toyota Corolla with his mother and $6,000 in savings. Soon after arriving in Los Angeles, he appeared on an episode of the CBS game show The Price Is Right, which aired on January 3, 2000. Appearing under his real name, he played and lost his pricing game and overbid on his Showcase. He also worked as a movie theater usher at Universal Studios in Hollywood.

Career

In 1996, Paul went to Los Angeles for the International Modeling and Talent Association competition. He won runner-up and signed with a manager. He starred in the music videos for Korn's song "Thoughtless" and Everlast's song "White Trash Beautiful". He was also featured in television commercials for Juicy Fruit, Corn Pops, and Vanilla Coke. He appeared in the films Whatever It Takes (2000), Help! I'm a Fish (2001), K-PAX (2001), National Lampoon's Van Wilder (2002), Bad Girls From Valley High (2005), Choking Man (2006), Mission: Impossible III (2006), The Last House on the Left (2009), and Need for Speed (2014). He starred as "Weird Al" Yankovic in the Funny or Die short Weird: The Al Yankovic Story (2010), and has guest starred on television shows such as The Guardian, CSI: Crime Scene Investigation, CSI: Miami, ER, Sleeper Cell, Veronica Mars, The X-Files, Ghost Whisperer, Criminal Minds, Bones.

Paul first became known for his role as Scott Quittman on HBO's Big Love, on which he appeared fourteen times. In 2008, he began playing Jesse Pinkman on the AMC series Breaking Bad. His character was originally meant to die during the first season, but after seeing the chemistry between Paul and the lead actor Bryan Cranston, the series creator Vince Gilligan changed his mind and modified the original plans to include Jesse as a main character. For his role in Breaking Bad, Paul was nominated for the Primetime Emmy Award for Outstanding Supporting Actor in a Drama Series in 2009, 2010, 2012, 2013, and 2014; he won the award in 2010, 2012, and 2014.

Paul starred in the film Smashed, which was one of the official selections for the 2012 Sundance Film Festival. In an October 2012 interview with ESPN, he spoke about his childhood experience as a Boise State Broncos fan and discussed the challenges of portraying a meth addict in Breaking Bad. In 2012 and 2013, he made appearances on Tron: Uprising, voicing a character named Cyrus.

In September 2013, he was featured on Zen Freeman's dance song, "Dance Bitch". He made a surprise appearance on Saturday Night Lives 39th season opener as "meth nephew", a relative of Bobby Moynihan's popular "drunk uncle" character. In 2014, Paul starred in Need for Speed, as a street racer recently released from prison who takes revenge on a wealthy business associate. Paul stars alongside Juliette Lewis in the family drama Hellion, as the drunken father of two young vandals. Also in 2014, he co-starred in the biblical epic Exodus: Gods and Kings, portraying the Hebrew prophet Joshua.

In December 2013, Netflix announced that Paul would be a cast member on the animated series BoJack Horseman. On March 3, 2014, he appeared on WWE Raw to promote Need for Speed, by entering the arena in a sports car with Dolph Ziggler, providing commentary for Ziggler's match against Alberto Del Rio, and helping Ziggler win by distracting Del Rio. On September 23, 2014, it was announced that Paul would play the young Louis Drax's father who becomes the focus of a criminal investigation after his son has a near-fatal fall in an upcoming Miramax film titled The 9th Life of Louis Drax, a supernatural thriller based on a book of the same name.

In 2016, Paul began playing Eddie Lane, a man who in a life crisis joins a cult but subsequently questions his faith, in the Hulu series The Path, which debuted on March 30, 2016. Paul voiced the main protagonist, Nyx Ulric, in Kingsglaive: Final Fantasy XV, released in July 2016.

In June 2018, Paul joined the cast of the Apple TV+ crime drama series Truth Be Told, opposite Octavia Spencer and Lizzy Caplan.

In September 2018, Paul joined the cast of the HBO science fiction western series Westworld for the third season, portraying the character Caleb Nichols.

Paul stars in the sci-fi thriller Dual alongside Karen Gillan and Jesse Eisenberg, which was filmed entirely in Tampere, Finland.

Paul will join the cast of the upcoming season of Black Mirror.

Personal life

Paul became engaged to actress and director Lauren Parsekian in Paris on January 1, 2012. The two met at the Coachella Festival. They were married on May 26, 2013, in a 1920s Parisian carnival-themed wedding in Malibu, California, at which Foster the People and John Mayer performed. Paul emailed the song "Beauty" by The Shivers to everyone on the guest list and asked them to learn the words so they could sing along during the ceremony. The couple's first child, a daughter named Story Annabelle, was born in February 2018. Their second child, a son named Ryden Caspian, was born in April 2022. On November 6, 2022, Paul legally changed his name to Aaron Paul. 

The family currently lives in the Los Feliz neighborhood of Los Angeles, having sold their previous home in West Hollywood, and maintains a second cabin-style home near McCall, "a small town two and a half hours away from Boise, Idaho".

To commemorate the final episode of Breaking Bad, Paul and his co-star Bryan Cranston both got Breaking Bad tattoos on the last day of filming in April 2013; Paul had the phrase "no half measures" tattooed onto his biceps, while Cranston got the show's logo tattooed on one of his fingers. In 2019, Paul and Cranston released their own line of mezcal called Dos Hombres.

In 2013, Paul helped organise a contest to raise $1.8 million for his wife's non-profit anti-bullying organization, the Kind Campaign. The winners of the contest won a trip to the Hollywood Forever Cemetery screening of the final episode of Breaking Bad.

During a 2013 ceremony at the Egyptian Theatre in Boise, Governor Butch Otter declared October 1 "Aaron Paul Sturtevant Day".

Awards and nominations

Filmography

Notes

References

External links

 
 
 
 

1979 births
20th-century American male actors
21st-century American male actors
American male film actors
American male television actors
American male voice actors
American people of English descent
American people of German descent
American people of Scottish descent
Contestants on American game shows
Living people
Male actors from Idaho
Outstanding Performance by a Supporting Actor in a Drama Series Primetime Emmy Award winners
People from Emmett, Idaho
People from Los Feliz, Los Angeles
Shorty Award winners